Hemimacquartia is a genus of flies in the family Tachinidae..

Species
Hemimacquartia paradoxa Brauer & Bergenstamm, 1893

References

Diptera of Europe
Exoristinae
Tachinidae genera
Taxa named by Friedrich Moritz Brauer
Taxa named by Julius von Bergenstamm